Milford Football Club is a former Irish football club based in the village of Milford, County Armagh. It was founded in 1885, joining the Irish Football Association in 1886 and was subsequently a founding member of the Irish Football League in 1890, but retained membership only for one season. The club won the inaugural Mid-Ulster Cup in 1887-88.

The club is most notable for being the place where the penalty kick was first introduced in 1890, when local goalkeeper William McCrum suggested a way to combat illegal challenges near to goal.

Honours

Senior honours
Mid-Ulster Cup: 2
1887-88, 1888–89

References

Association football clubs established in 1885
Defunct association football clubs in Northern Ireland
Defunct Irish Football League clubs
Association football clubs in County Armagh
1885 establishments in Ireland
Former senior Irish Football League clubs